Isaac Opoku Agyemang (born 19 July 1999) is a Ghanaian professional footballer who plays as a forward for Ashanti Gold. He previously played for Ghanaian side Ashanti Gold where he scored a brace on his Ghana Premier League debut in 2020.

Career

Early career 
Agyemang started his career with lower-tier side Lizbeth FC. He joined in 2018 the youth team of Ashanti Gold on loan. He also had a short stint with Tema Youth in the process.

Ashanti Gold 
On 16 July 2019, Ashanti Gold announced that they had signed him on a five-year deal, becoming the club's second signing of the season with right back Kwadwo Amoako being the first also joining the club from Techiman-based club Eleven Wonders and youngster Razak Simpson also joining. On 16 December 2020, Agyemang scored two goals and made an assist on his debut against King Faisal Babies. In the absence of Hans Kwofie and Dacosta Boadu he was handed his very first start in the Gold and Black shirt by Milovan Ćirković. The match ended in a 5–1, with a brace also from Yaw Annor and a goal from David Abagna. At the end of the match, he was awarded the man of the match.

References

External links 
 

Association football forwards
Ghanaian footballers
Ashanti Gold SC players
Ghana Premier League players
1999 births
Living people